Kohsan (Kohistan, Kūhestān) is a town and the administrative center of Kohsan District, Herat Province, Afghanistan. The population is 12,463 (est. 2007).

See also
Herat Province

Notes

Populated places in Herat Province